Simone Corazza (born 22 March 1991) is an Italian footballer who plays for  club Cesena.

Biography
On 5 July 2012 Corazza was signed by U.C. Sampdoria from Calcio Portogruaro Summaga, for €380,000 in a 4-year contract. In the same transfer window he returned to Portogruaro in a temporary deal. In 2013, he left for South Tyrol. On 9 July 2014 Corazza was signed by Novara Calcio in a temporary deal. On 10 July 2015 Corazza was signed by Novara in a definitive deal.

On 31 August 2017, he moved to Piacenza.

On 16 July 2019, he signed a 2-year contract with Reggina.

On 3 September 2020, he signed a 3-year contract with Alessandria.

On 25 July 2022, Corazza moved to Cesena on a three-year contract.

References

External links 
 
 Profile at Italian Footballers' Association (AIC), Data by www.Football.it 
 

1991 births
People from the Province of Udine
Footballers from Friuli Venezia Giulia
Living people
Italian footballers
Association football forwards
A.S.D. Portogruaro players
Venezia F.C. players
Valenzana Mado players
U.C. Sampdoria players
F.C. Südtirol players
Novara F.C. players
Piacenza Calcio 1919 players
Reggina 1914 players
U.S. Alessandria Calcio 1912 players
Cesena F.C. players
Serie B players
Serie C players
Serie D players